McAnally is a surname of Irish and Scottish origin; a variant of McNally. Notable people with the surname include:

 Charles McAnally (born 1836), American Civil War officer awarded the Medal of Honor
 John McAnally (born 1945), British Navy officer
 Lyman McAnally (born 1957), American musician
 Ray McAnally (1928–1989), Irish actor
Conor McAnally (born 1952), Irish television producer, Ray's son
Aonghus McAnally (born 1955), Irish broadcaster, Ray's son
Aonghus Óg McAnally (born 1980), Irish actor, Aonghus' son
 Ron McAnally (born 1932), American Thoroughbred horse trainer
 Shane McAnally (born 1974), American musician

See also
 Bill McAnally Racing, American professional stock car racing team